Mohammad Elias is a Bangladesh Muslim League politician and the former Member of Parliament of Moulvibazar-4.

Career
Elias was elected to parliament from Moulvibazar-4 as a Bangladesh Muslim League candidate in 1986.

References

Bangladesh Muslim League politicians
Living people
3rd Jatiya Sangsad members
Year of birth missing (living people)
Dhaka College alumni